The Solomons nightjar (Eurostopodus nigripennis) is a species of nightjar in the family Caprimulgidae.
It is found in the Solomon Islands archipelago. Its natural habitat is subtropical or tropical dry forests.

References

Solomons nightjar
Endemic birds of the Solomon Islands
Solomons nightjar
Solomons nightjar